The Tronado Machine was a device which employed ultra high frequency or microwave radiation as a hyperthermia therapy for cancer; however, tests have failed to back its treatment claims.  A man named Tronado designed the machine in the 1970s.

The treatment was improved and a new type of machine built by Dr John Holt who was formerly Head of Oncology at Sir Charles Gairdner Hospital, Perth, Western Australia. He later established an independent clinic in West Perth. After Holt's retirement the clinic moved to Claremont where a research institute was established alongside the clinic. A further treating facility was established by Dr Hugh Tinsley in Dublin, Ireland. This clinic and the treatment were assessed by the Irish government and the clinic received government grants to assist with the ongoing costs of establishment.

Lack of scientific validation
Tests conducted on behalf of the National Health and Medical Research Council of Australia have concluded that UHF Radiowave therapy produces no therapeutic benefit when used in conjunction with conventional cancer treatment. The report Review of the Use of Microwave Therapy for the Treatment of Patients with Cancer conducted a review of the literature as well as an audit of Dr. Holt's patient records between 1973 and 2003. Regarding the literature review, the report stated "There is currently no published scientific evidence that shows benefit of UHF cancer therapy alone or when combined with ‘glucose-blocking agents’ (GBA) as treatment for patients with cancer."

Regarding the audit of Dr. Holt's clinical data, the report says, in part, "Despite the small patient treatment groups, some trends were evident in this audit. Firstly, the complete remission rates were not high in any group. The study did not confirm Dr Holt’s previous reports of a 100% response rate for bladder tumours (Holt, 1988). The initial response rate (complete response and partial response) was 50% for RT alone, 34% for RT + UHF and 17% for UHF + GBA. Following salvage surgery, the overall response rate (complete response and partial response) was higher for patients treated with RT alone (44%) compared to RT+UHF (25%) or UHF + GBA (11%)."

See also
Rife machine

External links
Cancer patients - beware of 'cancer cures', PDF media release from NHMRC.
Radio-Wave Cancer Therapy, Layperson's Description of the Holt Method!
John Holt and the Media, including his response to the Australian government report
Dr. John Holt's own documentation of his treatment method

Alternative cancer treatments